is a district located in Fukushima Prefecture, Japan.

As of 2003, the district had an estimated population of 36,117 and a density of 111.59 persons per km2. The total area is 323.65 km2.

Towns and villages
Aizubange
Yanaizu
Yugawa

Mergers
On November 1, 2005, the town of Kawahigashi merged into the city of Aizuwakamatsu.

Districts in Fukushima Prefecture
District Kawanuma